The 1959 Fresno State Bulldogs football team represented Fresno State College—now known as California State University, Fresno—as a member of the California Collegiate Athletic Association (CCAA) during the 1959 NCAA College Division football season. 

Led by first-year head coach Cecil Coleman, Fresno State compiled an overall record of 7–3 with a mark of 5–0 in conference play, winning the CCAA title for the second consecutive year. The Bulldogs played home games at Ratcliffe Stadium on the campus of Fresno City College in Fresno, California.

Schedule

Team players in the NFL
The following were selected in the 1960 NFL Draft.

Notes

References

Fresno State
Fresno State Bulldogs football seasons
California Collegiate Athletic Association football champion seasons
Fresno State Bulldogs football